Nelson Head Light, also known as Nelson Head Inner Light, is an inactive, unusual lighthouse on Nelson Head, a headland northeast of the town of Nelson Bay, New South Wales, Australia, near Halifax Park, on the southern shore of Port Stephens. The light guided ships into the port. Unlike other lighthouses, the Nelson Head Light has no tower, but was shown through the window of the lantern room, and later mounted outside.

History 
The station was established in 1872 as four kerosene lamps shown from a wooden tower.

The current cottage was built three years later, and the light was first shown from it in 1876. The light was installed in an octagonal lantern room attached to the house, and shown through a  window. The house was occupied by 14 successive resident keepers, and the Maritime Service Board, until 1985.

The light was electrified in 1946, and automated in 1984. Since 1986, the house has been preserved and maintained by the Nelson Head Lighthouse and Rescue Station Trust. In 1990, the Royal Volunteer Coastal Patrol was appointed as trustee. The house is now managed by Marine Rescue NSW, under the Royal Volunteer Coastal Patrol, and serves as a maritime museum.

In 1995 the light was replaced with a solar powered lantern which was attached outside the previous lantern room. In early 2003 the light was deemed unnecessary, and it was shut down.

Visiting 
The house is accessible by road from Nelson Bay and is open daily to visitors.

See also 

 List of lighthouses in Australia

References and notes 

 
 
 
 Plaque on the site, can be seen in

External links 
 
 
 The museum
 Nelson Head Lighthouse

Lighthouses completed in 1875
Port Stephens Council
Lighthouses in New South Wales
1872 establishments in Australia